The Biennale Internazionale Dell’Arte Contemporanea, also known as the Florence Biennale is an art exhibition held in Florence, Italy. Since 1997 it has been held every two years in the exhibition spaces of the Fortezza da Basso, Florence.

The list of the famous participants include Marina Abramović, David Hockney, Christo & Jeanne-Claude, Gilbert & George, Anish Kapoor, El Anatsui and others.

The exhibition is held under the patronage of the UNESCO (the Italian Commission), European Parliament, Italian Ministry of Culture and Tourism, Tuscany Region, and Municipality of Florence.

History
The Biennale in its current form was begun in 1997 by Piero and Pasquale Celona.

The first Art Director of the Florence Biennale was the art historian Stefano Francolini. From 1998 to 2005 the Art Director in charge was the art historian and critic John Spike. Emanuel von Lauestein Massarani, Secretary of Culture and Superintendent of Cultural Heritage of São Paulo took over the job in 2007.  Stefano Francolini was made art director again in 2009 and 2011. Florentine art historian and critic Rolando Bellini was appointed in 2013 and is currently in charge.

Criticism 
The cost of the Florentine Biennale is borne directly by the participating artists. At the time this has given rise to criticism that the Florence Biennale is a vanity exhibition, but this changes as the artworks are judged before admission by a professional jury of leading international experts. Over the years, the Biennale has been positively assessed both quantitatively and qualitatively.
Juried artists shown in the exhibition pay a participation fee between $2700-$4000.

References

External links

 
 Florence Biennale, un'invasione di arte contemporanea in città / FOTO

Art biennials
Art exhibitions in Italy
Arts organisations based in Italy